Easkey Bog is a blanket bog, national nature reserve and Ramsar site of approximately  in County Sligo.

Features
Easkey or Easky Bog was legally protected as a national nature reserve by the Irish government in 1990. In 1990, the site was also declared Ramsar site number 471. A large portion of the bog has been deemed to be of international scientific interest.

The reserve contains the Cowagh River headwaters, a large plateau of highland blanket bog, with wet heath and mountain blanket bog set on the steep slopes of the Ox Mountains. There is a wide variety of diverse habitats, from quaking areas, stream, pool, flushes, heath slopes, and rock and peat lakes. Easkey Bog is one of only a small number of large areas of intermediate blanket bogs in Ireland, encompassing lowland and mountain blanket bog. It is rare in that it contains all three types of blanket bogs within close proximity. The reserve is home to red grouse and curlews, with the European golden plover overwintering there. There is also a population of Irish hare. A small flock of Greenland white-fronted geese migrate to the area in the winter.

References

Bogs of the Republic of Ireland
Landforms of County Sligo
Protected areas of County Sligo
Tourist attractions in County Sligo
Nature reserves in the Republic of Ireland
Protected areas established in 1990
1990 establishments in Ireland
Ramsar sites in the Republic of Ireland